Wilson Armas (born 2 April 1958) is an Ecuadorian footballer. He played in 14 matches for the Ecuador national football team from 1983 to 1985. He was also part of Ecuador's squad for the 1983 Copa América tournament.

References

1958 births
Living people
Ecuadorian footballers
Ecuador international footballers
Association football defenders
People from Ibarra, Ecuador
C.D. El Nacional managers
L.D.U. Loja managers